Monophyllus, the Antillean long-tongued bats or single leaf bats , is a genus of bats in the family Phyllostomidae. They are distributed on the Antilles.

Species
It contains the following species:
 Monophyllus plethodon Miller, 1900 — insular single leaf bat, Lesser Antillean long-tongued bat
 †Monophyllus plethodon frater Anthony, 1917 — Puerto Rican long-nosed bat
 Monophyllus plethodon luciae Miller, 1902
 Monophyllus plethodon plethodon Miller, 1900
 Monophyllus redmani Leach, 1821 — Leach's single leaf bat, Greater Antillean long-tongued bat
 Monophyllus redmani clinedaphus Miller, 1900
 Monophyllus redmani portoricensis Miller, 1900
 Monophyllus redmani redmani Leach, 1821

References

 
Bat genera
Bats of the Caribbean
Taxa named by William Elford Leach
Taxonomy articles created by Polbot